Proxicom, Inc. was an interactive agency that developed custom-tailored interactive and web-enabled solutions for Global 1000 organizations.  Founded in 1991 by American entrepreneur and philanthropist Raul Fernandez (entrepreneur), Proxicom was one of the original interactive professional services organizations from the dot com era. Proxicom provided services for a number of industries including: Automotive, Financial Services, Retail & Consumer Goods (CPG), Healthcare, Technology & Media, Government, Energy & Utilities, and Industrial Materials & Goods.

History of Proxicom

Overview
Proxicom, originally known as Proxima, was a systems integrator based in Reston, Virginia.  The original founder and CEO was Raul Fernandez. During the mid- and late nineties, Proxicom focused on the design and development of websites for companies including MCI, America Online, Marriott, Prudential, Morgan Stanley, and ExxonMobil.

In 1997 Proxicom became famous for developing polymer land - a disruptive online distribution platform for plastics following Jack Welch's motto "destroy your own business". polymerland is one example for B2B value chain disruption of the e-business era. Proxicom Develops Polymerland's New Web Site

In 1998, Proxicom purchased two organizations based on the West Coast of the United States. The first acquisition was Ibis Consulting, a technical integration firm located in San Francisco, California.  The second purchase was a user experience and creative design boutique entitled Ad Hoc based in Sausalito, California. With these additions, Proxicom had a nationwide presence with 7 office locations and more than 1,500 personnel.

In 1998 Proxicom acquired first customers in Europe, starting with projects at BMW Financial Services in Munich, Germany, where the first office was opened outside of the U.S.. The European offices contributed large Fortune 500 customers like Renault, DuPont Engineering Polymers, GE Plastics, and Deutsche Bank.

On April 14, 1999, Proxicom became a publicly traded organization listed on the NASDAQ stock exchange under the trading symbol PXCM.  This IPO netted Proxicom investors $58.5 million and Proxicom became known as one of the "little five" — competing against  MarchFirst/CKS-Web, Sapient, Scient, and Viant — within the interactive consulting arena.

In June 1999, Michael D. Beck was promoted  to Executive Vice President, Client Services for the Americas  and Proxicom grew to more than $200 million in revenues in 2000 with approximately 1,700 workers.  Beck would later join The IQ Business Group, Inc. (IQBG) as president and CEO. In January and February of that year, Michael Hansen and Heiner Rutt joined the company as vice president for international operations and president respectively. Rutt left to join the Carlyle Group, the global private equity firm in 2002, and Hansen moved to Bertelsmann in 2001.

The Dot Com Bubble

In April 2001, Proxicom was purchased by Dimension Data, a South African-based networking services company.  Dimension Data focused on the design, development, and construction of networking systems for global organizations. The goal of the Proxicom purchase was to quickly establish a services practice and brand presence within the United States.

The Rebirth

In 2004, The Gores Group LLC, a privately held investment firm based in Los Angeles, purchased Proxicom from Dimension Data. In 2005, Proxicom expanded its industry offerings through the purchase of a healthcare services firm,  Daou Systems, Inc.  Through diligent management and financial oversight, Proxicom leadership and the Gores Group successfully navigated the hurdles of the .com era to reestablish Proxicom within the interactive agency space.

In 2007, Proxicom was purchased by iCrossing.

Past Clients

References
Mazda North America Operations (MNAO), Mazda Chooses Proxicom To Put Zoom Zoom In Its New Mobile Web Site, March 2007
Philadelphia Business Journal, Proxicom Will Buy Daou, August 2005
EContent Digital Content Strategy & Resources, Verity and Proxicom Partner on Health Plan Provider Portal, July 2004
ClickZ Network, Proxicom Company Profile, August 2002
Microsoft News, Proxicom and Microsoft Form Strategic Alliance, February 2000
Business News Americas, Proxicom-Iberdrola to Provide B2B Ecommerce, September 1999
NASDAQ, NASDAQ Company Profile, April 1999
Smartmoney,A Better Internet Neighborhood?, September 1999

Footnotes

Companies based in Reston, Virginia
Marketing companies established in 1991
Software companies based in New York City
Northern Virginia
Digital marketing companies of the United States
1991 establishments in Virginia
Defunct software companies of the United States